The Chatsworth Estate may refer to:
 Chatsworth House and the surrounding lands in Derbyshire, England
 The Chatsworth Estate, the fictional setting of the C4 show, Shameless